Necatia is a genus of the jumping spider family Salticidae. Its only species, Necatia magnidens, is found in southern China.

The species is only known from a single female specimen, collected in 1872 by A. David, and described by Schenkel almost a hundred years later. Nothing more has been reported of the species since.

Description
From above, the carapace is U-shaped, slightly flared at the front. The female is slightly larger than 6 mm. The posterior lateral eyes are located almost halfway along the carapace. The abdomen is longer than broad and the legs are spiny. Schenkel described the specimen as having an overall brownish black color, "which is, perhaps, not surprising for a specimen preserved for so long".

Name
The genus name is dedicated to Necati Bingöl. magnidens is Latin for "big toothed".

Taxonomy
Taxonomically, this genus is interesting. The name Davidina was proposed by Brignoli in 1985 as a replacement for the original name Davidia, proposed by Schenkel in 1963. This was necessary according to ICZN rules, because Davidia had already been established by Hicks in 1873 as the name of a genus of Cycloconchidae, fossil mollusks. However, Brignoli overlooked that in 1879, Oberthür had already named a genus of Satyrini thus. Possibly, Brignioli believed the mollusk genus to be a nomen dubium; it is certainly weakly defined (Carter 1971 fide Sánchez 1999) but it is still generally accepted as valid. In any case, the lepidopteran genus is well-defined and valid. Thus, another replacement name for the spider became necessary.

References

Brignoli, Paolo Marcello (1985). On some generic homonymies in spiders (Araneae). Bulletin of the British Arachnological Society 6: 380.
 Schenkel, E. (1963). Ostasiatische Spinnen aus dem Muséum d'Histoire naturelle de Paris. Mémoires du Muséum national d'Histoire naturelle A 25: 1-481.
 Sánchez, Teresa M. (1999). New Late Ordovician (Early Caradoc) Bivalves from the Sierra de Villicum (Argentine Precordillera). Journal of Paleontology 73 (1): 66-76.  - Imageless HTML fulltext
 Özdikmen, H. (2007). Nomenclatural changes for seven preoccupied Spider genera (Arachnida: Araneae). Munis Entomology & Zoology 1(2): 137-142. PDF

Salticidae
Monotypic Salticidae genera
Spiders of China